Karlodinium corrugatum is a species of unarmored dinoflagellates from the genus Karlodinium. It was first isolated from the Australian region of the Southern Ocean, just south of the polar front. It is small-sized and is characterized by having distinctive striations on the epicone surface which are parallel, and a distinctively shaped and placed ventral pore. It is considered potentially ichthyotoxic.

References

Further reading

External links

WORMS

Species described in 2008
Gymnodiniales